Charaxes mycerina, the mycerina untailed charaxes, is a butterfly in the family Nymphalidae. It is found in Sierra Leone, Liberia, Ivory Coast, Ghana, Nigeria, Cameroon, the Central African Republic, the Republic of the Congo, Gabon, the Democratic Republic of the Congo and Equatorial Guinea. The habitat consists of lowland evergreen forests. An uncommon species

Description
Very similar to Charaxes doubledayi and similar to other members of the Charaxes lycurgus group but forewing upperside without marginal marks. Hindwing with almost contiguous blue marginal lines.

Subspecies
Charaxes mycerina mycerina (Sierra Leone, Liberia, Ivory Coast, Ghana, western Nigeria)
Charaxes mycerina nausicaa Staudinger, 1891  (eastern Nigeria, Cameroon, Central African Republic, Congo, Gabon, Democratic Republic of the Congo, Bioko)

Taxonomy
Charaxes mycerina is a member of the species group Charaxes lycurgus. 
The supposed clade members are:

Clade 1 
Charaxes lycurgus nominate
Charaxes porthos 
Charaxes zelica

Clade 2
Charaxes mycerina 
Charaxes doubledayi

References

Victor Gurney Logan Van Someren, 1974 Revisional notes on African Charaxes (Lepidoptera: Nymphalidae). Part IX. Bulletin of the British Museum of Natural History (Entomology) 29 (8):415-487.

External links
Images of C. mycerina mycerina Royal Museum for Central Africa (Albertine Rift Project)
Charaxes mycerina images at Consortium for the Barcode of Life
Charaxes mycerina viettei images at BOLD
External image

Butterflies described in 1824
mycerina